{{Album ratings
| rev1      = AllMusic
| rev1Score =  
| rev2 = Christgau's Record Guide
| rev2Score = C
|rev3 = The Encyclopedia of Popular Music
|rev3score = 
|rev4 = MusicHound Rock: The Essential Album Guide
|rev4score = 
|rev5 = The Rolling Stone Album Guide
|rev5score = 
}}Blue River is an album by folk rock musician Eric Andersen, released in 1972. The album was reissued in 1999 by Columbia Legacy with two extra tracks.

Production
The album was recorded in Nashville, Tennessee. Joni Mitchell contributes vocals on the title track, "Blue River".

Critical receptionNo Depression called the album's sound "subtle and incandescent," writing that producer Norbert Putnam "crafted a sound that was both sensual and spacious — at times reminiscent of Van Morrison’s Astral Weeks — and always attentive to the languid melodies and sometimes frightening intimacy of Andersen’s lyrics." MusicHound Rock: The Essential Album Guide wrote that the album "stands alongside anything that the singer-songwriter produced during the '70s." The Los Angeles Times'' deemed it "a delicately melodic, bittersweetly introspective song cycle that found its place within the Carole King-James Taylor-Joni Mitchell-Jackson Browne school of sensitive pop."

Track listing
"Is It Really Love at All"  (Andersen) – 5:21
"Pearl's Goodtime Blues"  (Andersen) – 2:21
"Wind and Sand"  (Andersen) – 4:30
"Faithful"  (Andersen) – 3:15
"Blue River"  (Andersen) – 4:46
"Florentine"  (Andersen) – 3:31
"Sheila"  (Andersen) – 4:37
"More Often Than Not"  (David Wiffen) – 4:52
"Round the Bend"  (Andersen) – 5:38
"Come To My Bedside, My Darlin'"  (Andersen) - 4:58 ~*
"Why Don't You Love Me"  (Hank Williams) - 2:54 ~*

~* = Bonus Track on CD Release (recorded during album sessions)

Charts

Personnel
Eric Andersen - acoustic guitar, electric guitar, piano, harmonica, vocals
David Bromberg - dobro, acoustic guitar
Andy Johnson - electric guitar, acoustic guitar, vibraphone, background vocals
David Briggs - organ, keyboards, celeste
Weldon Myrick - steel guitar
Norbert Putnam - bass
Glen Spreen - organ, harpsichord, keyboards, woodwinds
Eddie Hinton - acoustic guitar, electric guitar
Grady Martin - gut string guitar, acoustic guitar
Kevin Kelly - accordion
Mark Sporer - bass
Kenneth Buttrey - drums, percussion, tambourine
Jim McKevitt - drums
Rick Shlosser - drums
Deborah Andersen - piano, background vocals
Joni Mitchell - vocals, background vocals
Farrell Morris - vibraphone, background vocals
Jerry Carrigan - percussion
Millie Kirkham - background vocals
Sonja Montgomery - background vocals
Laverna Moore - background vocals
Florence Warner - background vocals
Temple Riser - background vocals
The Jordanaires - background vocals
The Holidays - background vocals

Production
Producer: Norbert Putnam
Recording Engineer: Stan Hutto/Glen Kolotkin/Stan Tonkel
Production Manager: Jessica Sowin
Art Direction: John Berg
Liner Notes: Anthony DeCurtis
Photography: Urve Kuusik/Sandy Speiser/Don Nelson

References

Eric Andersen albums
1972 albums
Columbia Records albums
Albums produced by Norbert Putnam